Michelle Cristina Fazzari (born July 10, 1987) is a Canadian wrestler. She finished in 5th place at the 2014 World Wrestling Championships.  She has been ranked number 2 in the world.

Three weeks after undergoing knee surgery, Fazzari made her Pan Am Games debut at Toronto 2015, finishing seventh.  Ivan Yarygin Grand-prix bronze medalist 2015

In July 2016, she was officially named to Canada's 2016 Olympic team. In 2021, she won the gold medal in the 62 kg event at the Matteo Pellicone Ranking Series 2021 held in Rome, Italy.

References

External links 
 

1987 births
Brock Badgers wrestlers
Canadian female sport wrestlers
Living people
Sportspeople from Hamilton, Ontario
Wrestlers at the 2014 Commonwealth Games
Wrestlers at the 2015 Pan American Games
Wrestlers at the 2016 Summer Olympics
Olympic wrestlers of Canada
Wrestlers at the 2018 Commonwealth Games
Commonwealth Games medallists in wrestling
Commonwealth Games silver medallists for Canada
World Wrestling Championships medalists
Pan American Games competitors for Canada
20th-century Canadian women
21st-century Canadian women
Medallists at the 2018 Commonwealth Games